Edward Henry Greb (June 6, 1894 – October 22, 1926) was an American professional boxer. Nicknamed "The Pittsburgh Windmill", he is widely regarded by many boxing historians as one of the best pound for pound boxers of all time.

He was the American light heavyweight champion from 1922 to 1923 and world middleweight champion from 1923 to 1926. He fought a recorded 298 times in his 13 year-career, which began at around 140 pounds. He fought against the best opposition the talent-rich 1910s and 20s could provide him and despite starting as a welterweight, he was frequently squaring off against and beating light heavyweights and even heavyweights.

Greb had a highly aggressive, very fast, swarming style of fighting and buried his opponents under a blizzard of punches. He was elusive with very good footwork to jump in and out on opponents. He was also a master at dirty fighting and had no qualms about employing all manner of dubious tactics, such as spinning his opponent and using the heel and laces of his gloves. Greb often got as much as he gave and unbeknownst to the press continued to fight a number of matches even as he became blind in one eye, due to an injury suffered in an earlier match. The 'Pittsburgh Windmill' was also very durable, suffering only 2 TKO losses in his whole career. The first was in his seventh bout when he was knocked out by an opponent who heavily outweighed him, the second happened 3 years later when Greb broke the radius of his left arm. Greb finished the round but was unable to continue the fight. Greb's ultimate weakness may have been his lack of knockout power; although he was able to hurt and bust up many opponents due to the constant onslaught of clean punches he landed on them, he struggled to stop them but this was mostly due to the fact that his opponents were much larger than him. He launched a vicious beating on the much larger Tunney on two occasions, cutting him and hurting him badly, but was unable to knock him out both times. It was the same process with many opponents.

Widely considered one of the best fighters of all time, Greb is currently ranked by BoxRec as the 5th greatest fighter of all time. Greb was also named the 2nd greatest fighter of the past 80 years by the Ring Magazine, the 5th greatest fighter of all-time by historian Bert Sugar, the 4th greatest fighter of all-time by historian and boxing commentator Max Kellerman and ranked as the #1 middleweight, the #3 light heavyweight, and the #2 pound-for-pound fighter of all-time by the International Boxing Research Organization.

Professional career
Born as Edward Henry Greb to a German immigrant father and mother of German descent, Pius and Annie Greb, who raised him in a working class household. Blue collar Greb began his professional boxing career in 1913, fighting mostly around his hometown of Pittsburgh. By 1915, he was fighting world class opposition, notably hall of famer Tommy Gibbons and reigning middleweight champion George Chip, whom he faced twice during 1915–1916 in non-title fights. Greb would lose both fights by "newspaper" decision (at the time, the rendering of an official decision at the end of a fight was prohibited, so newspapers covering the fight would render a decision), losses he would later avenge.

Greb would fight 37 times in the sole year 1917 (a record), winning 34 of those fights either officially or unofficially. Among his defeated opponents that year were the reigning light heavyweight champion Battling Levinsky (in a non-title fight), former light heavyweight champion Jack Dillon, middleweight George Chip and heavyweight Willie Meehan, who had beaten future heavyweight champion Jack Dempsey earlier in the year.

Despite all these great results, Greb was still denied a chance to fight for a title. A February 1918 newspaper draw against Mike O'Dowd, who would go on to win the middleweight title during the year, and a newspaper loss to Billy Miske, did not help in his effort. After that setback though, Greb would win his next 52 fights in a row. During that stretch, he beat future light heavyweight champion Mike McTigue, heavyweight contenders Billy Miske, Mike Gibbons, Bill Brennan, Jeff Smith, Leo Houck 3 times, and Battling Levinsky no less than four times during that stretch (6 times altogether) in newspaper decisions. Levinsky was the reigning light heavyweight champion at the time.

Vision problems
In 1921, during a fight with tough light heavyweight Kid Norfolk (real name William Ward), he was thumbed in the right eye, which is believed to have resulted in a retinal tear.  The injury would eventually lead to permanent blindness. Greb fought on admirably, winning via ten-round newspaper decision and finally getting a shot at the middleweight title. It is commonly believed that Greb completely lost sight in the eye after his fifth bout with Bob Roper, after which it took almost two months to recover and he was seen in a hospital with patches over both eyes. Incredibly, he kept the injury a secret from all but his wife and closest friends, fooling physicians during pre-fight physicals by memorizing the order of the letters on the eye chart (Greb would later lose some vision in his left eye and his gradual loss of sight led him to always go to bed with the light on).

Greb vs. Tunney
On May 23, 1922, Harry Greb was matched with Gene Tunney, the undefeated American light heavyweight champion (the world title was then in the hands of Frenchman Georges Carpentier) in what would arguably end up being the defining bout of his career. In the first round Greb immediately fractured Tunney's nose in two places and then proceeded to open a deep gash over the reigning champ's left eye. According to eye-witness reports, Greb was subsequently forced to commission the referee to intermittently wipe off his bloodstained gloves with a towel. Throughout the bout, Greb would repeatedly petition the referee to stop the fight while a determined Tunney concurrently implored him to allow the contest to continue. Round after round, the beating continued with Tunney refusing to submit and even smiling during the bloodshed to keep the referee from halting the match. At the end of fifteen brutal rounds, Tunney was a bloody mess and Greb was crowned champion via unanimous decision. This was the first and only professional loss in Tunney's career, with the bout being hailed as the Fight of the Year for 1922 by the Ring Magazine.

After defending his title against Tommy Loughran, Greb granted Tunney a rematch. In a hotly disputed battle, fought at Madison Square Garden in February 1923, Tunney regained his title by a highly controversial split decision. Multiple eyewitness reports state that Greb controlled the fight and battered Tunney, cutting him and rocking him from punches on more than one occasion. But Tunney was able to fight back unlike in the first encounter and at some points was competitive with Greb. The crowd booed heavily when Tunney was announced as the winner.

The two men would meet three more times, with Tunney successfully defending his regained title in another fifteen round bout and then fighting to a no decision newspaper draw, where most newspapers had Greb winning but referee Matt Hinkel stated he would have ruled a draw, so the record books have it that way. The fifth battle was reminiscent of the first fight in their series, except this time it was Tunney bludgeoning Greb for the duration of the bout. According to Tunney, near the end of the match while the two fighters were locked in a clinch, Greb straightforwardly asked Tunney not to knock him out. Tunney reputedly acquiesced to this request and later acknowledged the incident as the highest tribute he received in his career, stating "Here was one of the greatest fighters of all time laying down his shield, admitting defeat and knowing I would not expose him". Tunney would go on to beat Jack Dempsey for the heavyweight title. Greb remained the only man ever to have beaten Tunney, and the latter would be among the pall-bearers at Greb's funeral.

Middleweight champion
One month after losing his light heavyweight title to Tunney, Greb set his sights on middleweight champion Johnny Wilson; however, when Wilson's manager Marty Killelea refused to offer him the bout Greb reportedly devised an ingenious solution. He apparently paid a few speakeasy waiters in Pittsburgh and New York to serve him water in colored tumblers, and then proceeded to feign intoxication in a highly theatrical spectacle. When Killelea witnessed one of these performances, he assumed Greb was ripe for the taking and hurriedly arranged for the bout to take place. On August 31, 1923, Greb faced Wilson for the world middleweight title, winning a workmanlike 15-round decision in what would be nothing short of a roughhouser battle. When referee Jack O'Sullivan stepped in to separate the fighters during a particular rough clinch, he incredulously asked Greb what he thought he was doing, to which Greb responded, "Gouging Johnny in the eye, can't you see?" Greb would grant Wilson a rematch on January 18, 1924, in Madison Square Garden, winning another 15-round decision.

Greb vs. Walker
Greb's most notable defense of the title was against reigning world welterweight champion, Mickey Walker in July 1925, at the Polo Grounds in New York. Most pundits and even Walker himself believed that Greb would have trouble making the 160 lb weight limit, but when it was reported that Greb weighed in at 157 1/2 lbs he was inserted as the 9–5 odds favorite. During the first few rounds of the battle, Walker came out attacking Greb to the body as the defending champion apparently tried to stave off cramps in both his legs. The middle rounds saw Greb starting to relax and control the pace of the bout while Walker was still able to land some eye-catching combinations. The championship rounds were all Greb, who during the 14th round, attempted to knock out a tiring Walker by overwhelming him with a torrid onslaught of punches. Walker was able to withstand the assault, and Greb was awarded a unanimous decision by the judges and retained the championship. Walker, a great fighter who would win the middleweight title the following year, relayed years later a tale that he stumbled upon Greb at a nightclub after their fight, and, according to the legend, the two fought an impromptu rematch there. According to some reports, Greb easily won the spontaneous rematch while the general consensus maintains that Walker landed a sucker punch on Greb that knocked him out cold. According to Walker himself, the two were sitting down discussing their fight over a drink when Walker made a comment stating that he felt had it not been for Greb thumbing him in the eye, he would have won the fight. The heavily intoxicated Greb took great offence to this and jumped to his feet to fight. As he was struggling to take off his jacket, Walker seized the moment and landed a vicious uppercut that would have knocked out anyone but not Greb, the two fought and ended up outside where several friends of each separated the men.

(keep in mind that there is no report in any newspaper the next day of this supposed nightclub fight. The story appears to have been made up long after Greb died. Everyone who was with Greb that night refuted it, as did some of Walker's people. His manager at the time, Joe Degnan, said that Mickey was taken to Polyclinic Hospital after the fight to have his cuts stitched up and then they spent the night icing him down to reduce the swelling all over him. He was in no condition to go anywhere or fight anyone).

Later career
At 32, a shopworn Greb was years past his best when he was matched with tricky southpaw Tiger Flowers (who was a one-year junior of Greb) in Madison Square Garden in February 1926. Flowers, a defensive specialist, countered the Smoke City Wildcat's attacks well and won a disputed decision after fifteen rounds to annex Greb's middleweight title. Flowers beat Greb again in their rematch six months later, on an even more controversial decision, with the fans storming the ring in protest of the outcome. Greb later stated, "Well that was one fight I won if I ever won any.", in reference to what would end up being the last battle in a legendary career.

Retirement and death
Greb retired following the second Flowers loss and relayed to a friend that he planned on opening a gym in downtown Pittsburgh. In September 1926, he had his right eye removed and replaced with a glass prosthesis. Having declined a job as Jack Dempsey's sparring partner in preparation for Dempsey-Tunney I (Greb declaring: "I'd feel like a burglar taking Jack's money. Nobody can get him in good enough condition to whip Gene"), Greb checked into an Atlantic City clinic for surgery to repair damage to his nose and respiratory tract caused by his ring career and several car crashes. However, complications occurred and he died of heart failure on October 22, 1926, at 2:30 pm. Greb was buried at Calvary Cemetery in his hometown of Pittsburgh, Pennsylvania.

Legacy
Greb is remembered for his indomitable fighting spirit and the will to face all viable opposition despite assumed disadvantages. Especially laudable was his willingness to box highly skilled African-American fighters that included Jack Blackburn, Kid Norfolk and Tiger Flowers in an era when many white boxers refused to do so. In total, Greb faced 16 Hall of Famers, including Jack Blackburn, who got in as a trainer, not a fighter, a combined total of 48 times during his career, going 32–11–5 against men who would later be defined as all-time greats. In 1919 alone, he fought 45 fights and went 45–0, a feat that is extremely unlikely to be repeated given the current trajectory taken by modern boxers. Greb was enshrined in the Ring Magazine Hall of Fame in 1955, the Pennsylvania Sports Hall of Fame in 1970, the World Boxing Hall of Fame in 1980, and the International Boxing Hall of Fame as a first-class inductee in 1990.

Professional boxing record
All information in this section is derived from BoxRec, unless otherwise stated.

Official record

All newspaper decisions are officially regarded as “no decision” bouts and are not counted in the win/loss/draw column.

Unofficial record

Record with the inclusion of newspaper decisions in the win/loss/draw column.

See also
List of middleweight boxing champions

References

Further reading

External links

Harry Greb - CBZ Profile
https://boxrec.com/media/index.php/The_Ring_Magazine%27s_Annual_Ratings:Middleweight--1920s

Harry Greb's Website
Gene Tunney's Description of Harry Greb
Harry Greb's and Gene Tunney's Pictures
 https://titlehistories.com/boxing/na/usa/ny/nysac-m.html
 https://titlehistories.com/boxing/wba/wba-world-m.html

|-

1894 births
1926 deaths
Boxers from Pittsburgh
American people of German descent
Burials at Calvary Catholic Cemetery (Pittsburgh)
Middleweight boxers
Light-heavyweight boxers
World boxing champions
International Boxing Hall of Fame inductees
American male boxers
Sportspeople with a vision impairment